Salvatore Gallo may refer to:

 Salvatore Gallo (footballer) (born 1992), Italian footballer
 Salvatore Gallo (sculptor) (1928–1996), Italian sculptor